Padmaja Rao is an Indian actress, TV serial director and producer in Karnataka, India.  She is a versatile actor known for playing a wide variety of character roles in various film genres. Some of the notable films of Padmaja Rao as an actress include  Hatavadi (2006) Mungaru Male (2006), Gaalipata (2008), Ugramm (2014). She has also forayed into tulu film industry with the blockbuster Chaali Polilu (2014)

Personal life
Padmaja Rao did her schooling in Mumbai and then her college in London. She is married and has a son named Sanjeev who is renowned Herpetologist Conservationist and Animal Activist .

Career
Padmaja Rao started her career with the mega teleserial Moodala Mane directed by Vaishali Kasaravalli which garnered huge popularity across Karnataka. This was followed by Preethi Illada Mele mega serial co-starring Yash and Anant Nag which made her household name yet again. She made her Kannada movie debut with V.Ravichandran's Hatavadi. She subsequently received recognition for her role in the 2006 blockbuster Mungaru Male. She was nominated for the Filmfare Award for Best Supporting Actress three times. She has been a part of more than 100 Kannada films and many serial/soaps in Kannada. She has also worked as TV serial director and Producer.

Selected filmography

 Hatavadi (2006)
 Mungaru Male (2006)
 Gunavantha (2007)
 Gaalipata (2008)
 Rocky (2008)
 Madesha (2008)
 Psycho (2008)
 Taj Mahal (2008)
 Circus (2009)
 Vayuputra (2009)
 Mylari (2010)
 Prithvi (2010)
 Pancharangi (2010)
 Sri Harikathe (2010)
 Krishnan Love Story (2010)
 Silence (2010)
 Aata (2011)
 Shiva (2012)
 Parijatha (2012)
 Varadhanayaka (2013)
 Bachchan (2013)
 Bahaddur (2014)
 Nam Duniya Nam Style (2014)
 Chaali Polilu (2014)
 Athi Aparoopa (2014)
 Brahma (2014)
 Typical Kailas (2014)
 Kwatle Satisha (2014)
 Daksha (2015)
 Vajrakaya (2015)
 Ring Road (2015)
 Muddu Manase (2015)
 Rocket (2015)
 Style King (2016)
 Jai Maruthi 800 (2016)
 Eradane Sala (2017)
 Chowka (2017)
 Kanaka (2018)
 Dalapathi (2018)
 Krishna Tulasi (2018)
 Orange (2018)
 Brahmachari (2019)
 Rustum (2019)
 Adyaksha in America (2019)
 Body God (2022)
 Petromax (2022)

Television series 

 As a director and producer and actor

 Benkiyalli Aralida Hoovu (Zee Kannada)
 Sama Rekhegalu
 Shikara
Jothe Jotheyali
 Hoovi

Game shows 

 Savalige Sai (Udaya TV)
 Thutha Mutha (Udaya TV)
 Krazy Couple (Zee Kannada)
 Paddus Kitchen (Kalki Kannada)

Short films 

 Chocolate (Kannada)
 Me too (English)
 Oofie (English)

References

External links

Actresses in Kannada cinema
Living people
Kannada people
Actresses from Karnataka
Actresses from Bangalore
Indian film actresses
20th-century Indian actresses
21st-century Indian actresses
Actresses in Kannada television
Actresses in Kannada theatre
Year of birth missing (living people)